The College Fix is an American conservative news website focused on higher education. It was created in 2011 by journalist John J. Miller and is published by the non-profit Student Free Press Association (SFPA). The site features "right-minded news and commentary" and often reports on what it describes as "political correctness."

The Fix features student and non-student writers. It is based in Hillsdale, Michigan. Rick DeVos, the son of former US Secretary of Education Betsy DeVos, sits on the Fix’s board.

Model 

The Chronicle of Higher Education described The College Fix as a website designed to recruit "young conservatives for careers in the news media by placing college students in internships with right-leaning publications." Miller had long desired "to help other conservative and libertarian campus journalists" and The Fix gives them a platform where they will get "more attention than from just the campus level."

As of 2015, The Fix had three full-time editors and one part-time editor who oversee a network of approximately 75 contributors.

Accuracy, funding and editorial stance 

The Chronicle of Higher Education reported in 2015 that some subjects covered by The Fix had accused the website of misreporting their stories. The Fix editor Jennifer Kabbany defended the site's coverage and said that the site offers those it covers an opportunity to comment. In addition, Kabbany told NPR in April 2018 that the site "has publicly denounced any vile emails that a professor might get."

In February 2017 Inside Higher Ed probed whether The Fix had failed to disclose its relationship to the son of Betsy DeVos, weeks before her appointment as the US Secretary of Education. As early as 2015, Rick DeVos had served as a board member of Student Free Press Association, though this relationship was not disclosed in the site's coverage of DeVos. Days after the report John Miller apologized and took blame for the oversight.

The Donors Capital Fund gave $365,600 to the Student Free Press Association from 2014 to 2015, before ceasing contributions. The site reported receiving $749,509 in contributions from various sources in 2018.

Staff
John J. Miller, founder and executive director
Katherine Miller, founding editor-in-chief
Nathan Harden, editor-in-chief from 2012–2014
Jennifer Kabbany, current editor-in-chief

See also 
Campus Reform

References

External links

American conservative websites
American student news websites
Internet properties established in 2011
2011 establishments in the United States